Aïn Oussera Airport  is a military airport located near Aïn Oussera, Djelfa, Algeria.

See also
List of airports in Algeria

References

External links 
 Airport record for Aïn Oussera Airport at Landings.com

Airports in Algeria
Buildings and structures in Djelfa Province